Belverd Needles is an American economist, currently the Ernst & Young Distinguished Professor of Accountancy at DePaul University. He holds a PhD in Accounting (with a Finance and Economics minor) from the University of Illinois at Urbana–Champaign, and Master of Business Administration and Bachelor of Business Administration degrees from Texas Tech University.

Needles began working at DePaul University in September 1978.

References

Year of birth missing (living people)
Living people
DePaul University faculty
American economists
University of Illinois alumni
Texas Tech University alumni